PDMI (Portable Digital Media Interface) is an interconnection standard for portable media players. It has been developed by CEA (Consumer Electronics Association) as ANSI/CEA-2017-A standard Common Interconnection for Portable Media Players in February 2010. Chaired by David McLauchlan from Microsoft, the standard was developed with the input or support of over fifty consumer electronics companies worldwide.

Development and history 
CEA-2017-A is the new revision of the earlier ANSI/CEA-2017 standard adopted in July 2007, which used a proprietary serial protocol based on Media Oriented Systems Transport (MOST) in-vehicle network; the 2007 revision has seen only marginal use in actual devices.   New CEA-2017-A devices are not compatible with devices manufactured under the 2007 revision.

PDMI connector is intended to serve as a common interconnection between docking devices and displays and portable/nomadic devices with media playback capability. Intended host devices include docking stations for home A/V equipment, in-car entertainment systems, digital media kiosks, and hotel/in-flight entertainment systems, where PDMI aims to replace the ubiquitous iPod cradle connector.

PDMI uses a 30 pin receptacle with approximate size of 2.5 mm by 22 mm; a cradle-style connector is also defined. The PDMI connector includes the following electrical interfaces:
 2-lane DisplayPort v1.1a with AUX Channel, Hot Plug Detect, and 3.3 V power line
 USB 3.0, USB 2.0, and USB On-The-Go
 Analog stereo line-out for legacy audio
 HDMI CEC for remote control
 High output power line from both host and portable device

DisplayPort component provides data rate of 4.32 Gbit/s and supports up to 1080p60 video and 8-channel audio playback on an attached display device, as well as EDID and display control commands. DisplayPort signal can be converted to HDMI format using active converter circuitry in the dock or external signal conversion adapter powered by 3.3 V DisplayPort power.

Power supply from both the host (docking station) and portable device allows for supporting the portable device with power and battery charging, as well as supporting accessories from the portable device.

USB 3.0 "SuperSpeed", USB 2.0, and USB On-The-Go support file transfer and device control, as well as device-to-device intercommunication.

Devices that use PDMI 

The first mass-production device from a major manufacturer to incorporate PDMI is the Dell Streak, a  tablet device running the Android operating system version 1.6 through 2.2.

Pinout

References

External links
Purchase Standards
 CEA-2017 Rev A, Common Interconnection For Portable Media Players (PDMI), $75.
 CEA-2017.1 Rev 7, Serial Communication Protocol For Portable Electronic Devices, $156.
Slides
 DisplayPort Technical Overview; Slides; May 2010, contains slides about PDMI
Announcements
 CEA Announced Portable Media Connection Standard 
 CEA may spawn standards effort for handhelds

Audiovisual connectors
Digital display connectors
USB
Electronics standards
Telecommunications-related introductions in 2010